Noel Pagan, also known simply as Noel, (born 1965) is an American freestyle music singer born in the Bronx, New York City. His debut single, "Silent Morning", became his first Top 10 hit on the dance singles chart and peaked at No. 47 on the Billboard Hot 100 in 1987.

Career
Noel's 1987 debut single "Silent Morning" reached No. 47 on the Billboard Hot 100. His second single, "Like a Child", peaked at No. 67 in 1988, but it became his first number-one single on the dance chart. Also in 1988, Noel released his self-titled debut album, which peaked at No. 126 on the Billboard 200. He topped the dance charts again later that year with "Out of Time".

In 1990, Noel worked with Tony Moran on his project Concept of One, with Noel being the featured vocalist. The single was released as "The Question" by Concept of One featuring Noel, and received heavy airplay in clubs and on dance stations, and hit the dance charts.

In 1993, Noel's second album, Hearts on Fire, was released by Mercury Records. It represented a change in style for Noel, leaning more on pop than dance/freestyle. In this album, which differed from the previous, Claus came to record a cover of the song "Donna" by Ritchie Valens. It was not a success, and Noel was dropped from the label.

In the 1990s, "Silent Morning" was included in many compilations of freestyle hits.

Noel continues to perform and record music. In 2000, Noel was invited to participate in the festival Freestyle Reunion with various artists in the genre. In 2001, Noel teamed up with trance producer Ford for the single "Will I Find True Love".

In 2007, he released the single "I Feel Alive".

Personal life 
Noel resides in Bethlehem, Pennsylvania.

On July 5 2020, he was involved in a serious motorcycle accident and suffered a collapsed lung and fractured ribs, wrist, eye socket and nose.

Discography

Studio albums

Singles

See also
 List of number-one dance hits (United States)
 List of artists who reached number one on the US Dance chart
 Nuyorican
 Puerto Ricans in New York City

References

External links
 

American male singers
American freestyle musicians
American dance musicians
Living people
Singers from New York City
Island Records artists
Mercury Records artists
1965 births
People from Ridgewood, Queens